Achille-Louis-Joseph Sirouy  (29 November 1834 Beauvais - January 1904 Paris) was a French engraver, lithographer, painter and illustrator. He worked in Aurillac, Beauvais and Paris between 1849 and 1904. He depicted many mythological and biblical scenes, such as The Punishment of Tantalus (1866), The Mirror (1868), The Prodigal Son (1873) and The Sphinx (1880). He was awarded the Grand Cross of the Legion of Honour in 1869 for his lithographic work.

Sirouy illustrated Mark Twain's The Adventures of Tom Sawyer and The Adventures of Huck Finn.

He was given a number of commissions by the State, including the décor of the Palais de la Légion d'Honneur formerly known as l'Hôtel de Salm, when its interior was devastated by a fire in 1871.

Bibliography
Thieme-Becker, Bd. 31, 1937, S. 103

References

19th-century French painters
French male painters
École des Beaux-Arts alumni
20th-century French painters
20th-century French male artists
French engravers
19th-century engravers
20th-century engravers
1834 births
1904 deaths
French illustrators
People from Beauvais
20th-century French printmakers
Chevaliers of the Légion d'honneur
19th-century French male artists